Ronald Victor Thomas (7 August 1888 – 30 December 1936) was an Australian tennis player. He competed at the 1920 Summer Olympics.

Thomas won two doubles titles at the Australasian Championships (now the Australian Open), in 1919 and 1920, and one doubles title at the 1919 Wimbledon Championships. Thomas also finished as runner-up to Pat O'Hara Wood in men's singles at the 1920 Australasian Championships.

Grand Slam finals

Singles: 1 runner-up

Doubles: 3 titles

References

External links
 
 

1888 births
1936 deaths
Australasian Championships (tennis) champions
Australian male tennis players
Wimbledon champions (pre-Open Era)
Tennis players at the 1920 Summer Olympics
Olympic tennis players of Australia
Tennis people from South Australia
Grand Slam (tennis) champions in men's doubles